Mohammed Alabi Lawal (24 January 1946 – 15 November 2006) was a Nigerian naval officer who was military governor of Ogun State between December 1987 and August 1990 during the military administration of General Ibrahim Babangida. He was one of the pioneers of the Nigeria Navy Secondary School Abeokuta.The then Navy Captain Mohammed Lawal, invited the Nigerian Navy to consider a location of the defunct St Leo's Teachers' Training College at Ibara Abeokuta (www.nnssab.net)on a hilly Onikolobo site. This premises had been abandoned and merely serve as a route to the Catholic Compound and was also used for administering a newly conceived secondary school in that name. The Nigerian Navy considered the site and found it suitable. After the return to democracy in 1999 he was elected governor of Kwara State, holding office from 29 May 1999 to 29 May 2003.

During the 1999 Kwara State gubernatorial election, Lawal was elected governor under the umbrella of the All Peoples Party (APP). He was said to be a protégé of Senator Dr. Abubakar Olusola Saraki. Saraki later moved to the People's Democratic Party (PDP).

Lawal initiated a N250 million libel action against a paper The People's Advocate based in Ilorin, published by Abdulkareem Adisa but later withdrew the suit after the two men were reconciled.

In the 2003 Kwara State gubernatorial election,  he ran for reelection but lost as his previous supporter Abubakar Saraki backed his son Bukola Saraki as candidate for governor of Kwara state and his daughter Gbemisola R. Saraki as senator for Kwara State Central, both of whom were elected.

In October 2006, it was reported that Nuhu Ribadu, chairman of the Economic and Financial Crimes Commission was investigating Lawal for alleged diversion of funds.

Lawal died in a London hospital after a brief illness in November 2006.

References

1946 births
2006 deaths
All Nigeria Peoples Party politicians
Governors of Ogun State
Governors of Kwara State
Yoruba politicians
Yoruba military personnel
Deaths in England
People from Ilorin